Nikola Pokrivač (born 26 November 1985) is a former Croatian footballer who played as midfielder.

Club career

NK Varteks
Pokrivač started to play football with amateur side Bratstvo Jurovec, near his hometown. He went on to continue his youth career with Čakovec and NK Varteks, eventually advancing to the first team at Varteks in the summer of 2004.

Making his senior domestic league debut for Varteks against Zadar on 7 August 2004, Pokrivač went on to establish himself as a regular at the club in 2005. He also appeared in some European matches for the club, playing in the UEFA Intertoto Cup in the summer of 2005 and the UEFA Cup qualifying a year later. In 2006, he also played for Varteks in the two-legged final of the Croatian Cup, where they lost to Rijeka on away goals after a 5–5 draw on aggregate.

GNK Dinamo Zagreb
His good performances at Varteks eventually secured him a move to Croatia's top club Dinamo Zagreb in the winter break of the 2006–07 season. He quickly became a regular at his new club and also helped them winning both the Croatian league and cup titles in 2007. He also collected further experience in European competitions with Dinamo, making a total of 10 appearances in both the UEFA Champions League qualifying and the UEFA Cup during the first half of the 2007–08 season.

AS Monaco
On 30 January 2008, Pokrivač moved to French Ligue 1 side AS Monaco on a four-and-a-half-year contract. He made his league debut on 23 February 2008 in Monaco's 1–1 draw at Paris Saint-Germain, playing the full 90 minutes. He continued to appear regularly for the club over the following two months, until being sent off with a straight red card in the final moments of the club's away match against OGC Nice on 19 April 2008. He made a total of 9 appearances in the Ligue 1 during his first six months with the club.

Struggling to regain his place as a regular with Monaco during his second season with the club, he scored his first goal in the Ligue 1 in Monaco's 3–1 win at home to AS Nancy-Lorraine on 29 October 2008, also recording an assist in the same match. A month later, he scored the only goal in Monaco's 1–0 win at AJ Auxerre in the Ligue 1. He finished the 2008–09 season with a total of 23 appearances in the Ligue 1. On 4 March 2009, he also scored one goal for Monaco in their 2–0 win at AC Ajaccio in the Coupe de France round of 16.

Red Bull Salzburg
On 24 August 2009, it was announced that Pokrivač signed a three-year contract with Austrian side Red Bull Salzburg. He made his debut for the club on 29 August 2009 in their Bundesliga match against Kapfenberg, coming on as a substitute for Simon Cziommer in the 55th minute and scoring his first goal for the club when he netted the final goal in Salzburg's 4–0 win six minutes later.

On 26 September 2009, he scored his second Bundesliga goal for Salzburg in their 2–1 win at Austria Kärnten and delivered a superb performance in a 7–1 home win against the same club on 4 October 2009, participating in all of Salzburg's three goals in the first half. He first set up the opening goal of the match for Christoph Leitgeb in the 3rd minute, then scored the second goal in the 34th minute, before setting up the third goal of the match for Marc Janko in the 41st minute.

GNK Dinamo Zagreb
On 16 August 2011, Pokrivač signed a four-year contract with Dinamo Zagreb.

NK Inter Zaprešić
During the 2012-13 winter transfer window, Pokrivač was loaned out to Inter Zaprešić for the remainder of the season.

HNK Rijeka
On 7 June 2013, Pokrivač signed a two-year contract with Rijeka.

FC Shakhter Karagandy
In the summer of 2014, Pokrivač signed for Shakhter Karagandy.

International career
Pokrivač has played for the Croatian under-21 national team and has also represented the country at both the under-17 and under-19 levels. He won a total of 39 international caps and scored three goals for all Croatian youth national teams between 2001 and 2006.

On 5 May 2008, he received his first call-up for the Croatian national team at senior level, being added to their 23-man squad for the UEFA Euro 2008 finals in Austria and Switzerland. He went on to make his international debut on 24 May 2008 in a friendly match against Moldova in Rijeka, coming on as a substitute for Niko Kovač in the 59th minute. At the UEFA Euro 2008 finals, he only appeared in Croatia's final group match against Poland, completing the full 90 minutes in a 1–0 victory for Croatia.

Pokrivač went on to make five appearances in Croatia's unsuccessful qualifying campaign for the 2010 FIFA World Cup, appearing in both matches against Kazakhstan and England as well as the away fixture at Andorra. He only started one of the five matches, being in the starting line-up for Croatia in their 5–1 defeat to England at Wembley. However, he was substituted at half-time after a poor performance in the first half.

Pokrivač earned a total of 15 caps, scoring no goals. His final international was an October 2010 friendly against Norway.

Personal life
Pokrivač is married with Katarina Pokrivač and they have one daughter - Nika b.2012. He has been diagnosed with Hodgkin lymphoma and is undergoing treatment.

Career statistics

Club

International

Honours
Međimurje Čakovec
Druga HNL: 2003-04

Dinamo Zagreb
Croatian First Football League: 2006-07,  2007-08, 2011-12
Croatian Football Cup: 2007, 2008, 2012

Red Bull Salzburg
Austrian Football Bundesliga: 2009-10

HNK Rijeka
Croatian Football Cup: 2014

References

External links
 

1985 births
Living people
Sportspeople from Čakovec
Association football midfielders
Croatian footballers
Croatia under-21 international footballers
Croatia international footballers
UEFA Euro 2008 players
NK Varaždin players
NK Međimurje players
GNK Dinamo Zagreb players
AS Monaco FC players
FC Red Bull Salzburg players
NK Inter Zaprešić players
HNK Rijeka players
FC Shakhter Karagandy players
NK Slaven Belupo players
Croatian Football League players
Ligue 1 players
Austrian Football Bundesliga players
Kazakhstan Premier League players
Croatian expatriate footballers
Expatriate footballers in Monaco
Croatian expatriate sportspeople in Monaco
Expatriate footballers in Austria
Croatian expatriate sportspeople in Austria
Expatriate footballers in Kazakhstan
Croatian expatriate sportspeople in Kazakhstan